The Daily Prayer for Peace is a spiritual discipline unique to Community of Christ and practiced at the Independence Temple in the church's headquarters campus in Independence, Missouri. It falls within the most common category of Christian prayer known as supplication. 

Each day of the year at 1 p.m. Central Standard Time/Central Daylight Time a Daily Prayer for Peace is held as part of a brief worship for that purpose held in the sanctuary of the Independence Temple. The sanctuary is open to the public as members lead a brief worship service that includes the Daily Prayer for Peace. The form of the prayer is a public spoken prayer, usually written by one of the members from somewhere in the world and read aloud either by that member or another person. Each day of the year, the Daily Prayer for Peace is focused on the needs of a different nation of the world. The supplicant prays aloud for peace under the 150-foot dome of the temple spire.

Those living in or visiting Independence, Mo. are encouraged to stop in to participate in this worship experience, and those elsewhere around the globe are encouraged to pause for a moment of silent prayer.

Background
At the 1984 World Conference of Community of Christ, its President, Wallace B. Smith, called for the construction of the Independence Temple and its dedication "to the pursuit of peace."

A committee formed to consider the worship ministries to be held in the new temple, devised the idea of a Daily Prayer for Peace to act as a witness of Christ's peace and a "symbol of the Church's unrelenting pursuit of peace." 

The Daily Prayer for Peace has been held daily in the Independence Temple since December 1993. It is one of many practices, including the Community of Christ International Peace Award that distinguish the denomination and its members.

Prior to 9 April 2007 the Daily Prayer for Peace was held at 12:30 p.m. Central Standard Time/Central Daylight Time. With the change in time those working at Community of Christ International Headquarters are encouraged to pause and attend this service.

Since 26 October 2007 each Friday at Noon Eastern Time the Daily Prayer for Peace service is celebrated at the Kirtland Temple Complex as the Friday Prayer for Peace. Starting in May 2008 it started being celebrated daily in both Independence and Kirtland.

Order of service
The committee developed a standard order of service which is normally followed: Gathering in Silence, Call to Prayer, Lighting of Candle, Invitation, Scripture Reading, Prayer for Peace, Prayers of the People, Hymn, Benediction and Postlude.

Prayer topics
In order to ensure a truly global reach for the prayers, a different country is named each day as a  focus  of prayer. The schedule can be seen on the Community of Christ website http://www.cofchrist.org/prayerpeace/. This schedule reflects the ecumenical prayer cycle of the World Council of Churches, which lists  a nation or series of nations for each week of the year.

References

Laurie Smith Monsees, The Temple: Dedicated to Peace, Herald House: 1993.

External links
Daily Prayer for Peace official website
Community of Christ official website
Prayer types in Judaism, Christianity, and Islam: Do You Pray Like Your Fathers?

Christian prayer
Community of Christ
Religion and peace
1993 establishments in Missouri
1993 in Christianity
Latter Day Saint temple practices
Prayer for Peace